Alkan may refer to:

Places

Iran
 Alkan, Kohgiluyeh and Boyer-Ahmad
 Alkan, Qom

Turkey
 Alkan, Gülşehir, in Gülşehir district

Given name
 Alkan Chaglar (born 1981), Turkish Cypriot journalist and columnist

Surname
 Ahmet Alkan, Turkish economist
 Alphonse Alkan (1809–1889), French printer, bibliographer, and author
 Charles-Valentin Alkan (1813–1888), French composer known for his virtuosity as a pianist
 Ender Alkan, Turkish footballer
 Erden Alkan, Turkish actor
 Erol Alkan, British DJ
 Hüseyin Alkan (born 1988), Turkish Paralympian goalball player
 Okan Alkan, Turkish football
 Siegfried Alkan (1858–1941), German composer

Other uses
 Alkan Air, airline servicing northwestern Canada and Alaska

See also
 Alcan, Canadian mining company
 Alken (disambiguation)
 Alkin
 Alkon (disambiguation)

Turkish-language surnames
Turkish masculine given names